"The show must go on" is a well-known phrase in show business.

The Show Must Go On may also refer to:

Film, theatre, and television 
 The Show Must Go On (2007 film), a South Korean film directed by Han Jae-rim
 The Show Must Go On (2010 film), a Croatian film directed by Nevio Marasović
 The Show Must Go On (play), a 1991 play by Koki Mitani

Television episodes 
 "The Show Must Go On" (The Big O), 2003
 "The Show Must Go On??" (The Brady Bunch), 1972
 "The Show Must Go On" (ER), 2005
 "The Show Must Go On" (Grimm), 2014
 "The Show Must Go On" (McLeod's Daughters), 2009
 "The Show Must Go On" (The Nanny), 1994
 "The Show Must Go On" (One Tree Hill), 2006

Music 
 The Show Must Go On (album), by Shirley Bassey, 1996

Songs 
 "The Show Must Go On" (Leo Sayer song), 1973; covered by Three Dog Night, 1974
 "The Show Must Go On" (Pink Floyd song), 1979
 "The Show Must Go On" (Queen song), 1991
 "The Show Must Go On", by Chicago from Chicago XXXII: Stone of Sisyphus, 2008
 "The Show Must Go On", by Insane Clown Posse from Riddle Box, 1995
 "The Show Must Go On", by Nirvana from All of Us, 1968
 "Day After Day (The Show Must Go On)", by the Alan Parsons Project from I Robot, 1977

See also
 The Show Goes On (disambiguation)
 The Show Must Go Online, a 2020 British web series
 "Why Must the Show Go On?", a song written by Noël Coward, from the 1972 revue Cowardly Custard